Hydroxytyrosol is an organic compound with the formula . Classified as a phenylethanoid, i.e. a relative of phenethyl alcohol. Its derivatives are found in a variety of natural sources, notably olive oils and wines. Hydroxytyrosol is a colorless solid. although commercial samples are often beige. It is a derivative, formally speaking, of catechol.

It or its derivatives occurs in olives and in wines

Occurrence

Olives

The olives, leaves, and olive pulp contain large amounts of hydroxytyrosol derivative Oleuropein, more so than olive oil).  Unprocessed, green (unripe) olives, contain between 4.3 and 116 mg of hydroxytyrosol per 100g of olives, while unprocessed, black (ripe) olives contain up to 413.3 mg per 100g. The ripening of an olive substantially increases the amount of hydroxytyrosol. Processed olives, such as the common canned variety containing iron(II) gluconate, contained little hydroxytyrosol, as iron salts are catalysts for its oxidation.

Food safety 
Hydroxytyrosol is considered safe as a novel food for human consumption, with a no-observed-adverse-effect level of 50 mg/kg body weight per day, as evaluated by the European Food Safety Authority (EFSA).

In the United States, hydroxytyrosol is considered to be a safe ingredient (GRAS) in processed foods at levels of 5 mg per serving.

Function and production

In nature, hydroxytyrosol is generated by the hydrolysis of oleuropein that occurs during olive ripening. Oleuropein accumulates in olive leaves and fruit as a defense mechanism against pathogens and herbivores. During olive ripening or when the olive tissue is damaged by pathogens, herbivores, or mechanical damage, the enzyme β-glucosidase catalyzes hydroxytyrosol synthesis via hydrolysis from oleuropein.

Metabolism
Shortly after olive oil consumption, 98% of hydroxytyrosol in plasma and urine appears in conjugated forms (65% glucuronoconjugates), suggesting extensive first-past metabolism and a half-life of 2.43 hours.

Mediterranean diet 
Mediterranean diets, characterized by regular intake of olive oil, have been shown to positively affect human health, including reduced rates of cardiovascular diseases. Research on consumption of olive oil and its components includes hydroxytyrosol and oleuropein, which may inhibit oxidation of LDL cholesterol  a risk factor for atherosclerosis, heart attack or stroke. The daily intake of hydroxytyrosol within the Mediterranean diet is estimated to be between 0.15 and 30 mg.

Regulation

Europe
The EFSA has issued a scientific opinion on health claims in relation to dietary consumption of hydroxytyrosol and related polyphenol compounds from olive fruit and oil, and protection of blood lipids from potential oxidative damage.

EFSA concluded that a cause-and-effect relationship existed between the consumption of hydroxytyrosol and related compounds from olives and olive oil and protection of blood lipids from oxidative damage, providing a health claim for consumption of olive oil polyphenols containing at least 5 mg of hydroxytyrosol and its derivatives (oleuropein complex and tyrosol) per 20 g of olive oil.

See also 
 Echinacoside, a hydroxytyrosol-containing glycoside
 Tyrosol
 Verbascoside, another hydroxytyrosol-containing glycoside
 Resveratrol

References 

GPER agonists
Phenylethanoids
Phenol antioxidants
Monoamine oxidase inhibitors
Phytoestrogens